The Administrator Karachi is an Officer in the Pakistan Administrative Services, usually of the elite rank of BS-20 (Grade 20).

Incumbent 
Dr. Saif-ur-Rehman, an officer of PAS (BS-20), was appointed as Karachi Administrator on 8 December 2022.

Administrator of Karachi 
This position handles the administration of the government in and around Karachi, in the province of Sindh. The position of Administrator and Commissioner in the Karachi Division is considered to be one of the most senior positions in the Government of Sindh.

List of Administrators of Karachi

List of Commissioner Karachi 

In September 2020, the Commissioner of Karachi was Mr. Iftikhar Ali Shallwani, an Officer of the Pakistan Administrative Service with the elite rank of BS-21 / Grade 21.

, the Commissioner of Karachi is Mr. Navid Ahmed Shaikh, holding the same elite rank.

See also 

 Karachi Development Authority
Malir Development Authority
Lyari Development Authority
 Karachi Metropolitan Corporation
 Commissioners of Sind in British India
Commissioner Karachi
 Governor of Sindh
 Mayor of Karachi

References

External links 

 Commissioner of Karachi

Government of Karachi